Bogan v. Scott-Harris, 523 U.S. 44 (1997), is a ruling by the Supreme Court of the United States where the court decided unanimously local legislators are entitled to the same absolute immunity from civil liability under Section 1983 for their legislative activities as are federal, state and regional legislators regardless of motive or intent.

References 

United States Supreme Court cases
United States Supreme Court cases of the Rehnquist Court